The women's 5000 metres event at the 2015 European Athletics U23 Championships was held in Tallinn, Estonia, at Kadriorg Stadium on 12 July.

Medalists

Results

Final
12 July

Participation
According to an unofficial count, 17 athletes from 13 countries participated in the event.

References

5000 metres
5000 metres at the European Athletics U23 Championships